Iván González may refer to:

 Iván Darío González (born 1987), Colombian middle and long-distance runner
 Iván González Ferreira (born 1987), Paraguayan footballer
 Iván González (canoeist) (born 1964), Spanish canoeist
 Iván González López (born 1988), Spanish footballer
 Iván Hernández González, Puerto Rican politician